is one of Japan's top producers of frozen foods and a leader in cold storage warehousing, headquartered in Tokyo. Operating through around 80 subsidiaries and affiliates worldwide, its businesses include processed food; logistics; marine products (chiefly roe, shrimp, and octopus); meat and poultry; real estate; and biosciences. The company's bioscience work includes antibody development and manufacturing, immunology products, and natural materials processing.

History

The company was founded on 24 December 1942, as Teikoku Marine Products Control Company, with capital participation from 18 fisheries and other companies. It was established in accordance with the Fisheries Control Ordinance that was enacted on 19 May 1942, as a central agency to control seafood-related businesses such as sales of marine products, ice production, and refrigerated storage. On 1 December 1945, the day after the control ordinance was abolished (30 November 1945), the company was reorganized as a privately held company governed by the commercial code, and was renamed Nippon Reizo Co. Ltd. The new company was listed on the Tokyo Stock Exchange in 1949. Nippon Reizon changed its name to Nichirei Corporation in 1985.

References

Food and drink companies based in Tokyo
Real estate companies based in Tokyo
Service companies based in Tokyo
Disaster preparedness
Defense companies of Japan
Companies listed on the Tokyo Stock Exchange
Food and drink companies established in 1942
Japanese companies established in 1942
Fuyo Group